Hamish Hancock (born 1947) is a former National Party MP for Horowhenua and a lawyer.

Education
Hancock attended Wellington College and Victoria University of Wellington, where he earned an LLM.  He was active as a debater at University, earning a debating blue, and was awarded the Plunket Medal for debating in 1970.  Hancock was a member of the New Zealand national debating team in that year.

Legal career
Hancock practised as a solicitor for national law firm Rudd Watts and Stone, rising to a partnership.

Parliamentary career

Hancock was elected MP for the seat of Horowhenua, defeating sitting Labour MP Annette King by a small majority, after National's landslide win in 1990.  He subsequently lost the seat to Labour MP Judy Keall in 1993.

Later career
Hancock returned to practise as a solicitor, joining the Crown Law Office as Crown Counsel for public law.  He has defended the Crown against numerous public law actions, primarily in the High Court, the Court of Appeal, and the Supreme Court.

Hancock is married to Shelley, and they have four sons.

References

 1990 Parliamentary Candidates for the New Zealand National Party by John Stringer (New Zealand National Party, 1990)

1947 births
People educated at Wellington College (New Zealand)
Living people
20th-century New Zealand lawyers
New Zealand National Party MPs
Victoria University of Wellington alumni
Unsuccessful candidates in the 1993 New Zealand general election
Members of the New Zealand House of Representatives
New Zealand MPs for North Island electorates
21st-century New Zealand lawyers